Ninmah Corona is a corona found on the planet Venus, at  Mead Quadrangle. It is named after Ninmah, a Sumer-Akkadian mother goddess.

Geography and geology
Ninmah Corona covers a circular area of around 700 km in diameter. Ninmah Corona is one of the four major coronae of eastern Eistla Regio (Didilia, Pavlova, Ninmah, and Isong). These coronae have relatively similar structure: an uplifted concentric feature with a central dome and surrounded by a relatively flat interior floor.

See also
List of coronae on Venus

References 

Surface features of Venus